Thought stopping (TS) is a cognitive self-control skill that should be used to counter dysfunctional or distressing thoughts, in hopes of interrupting sequences or chains of problem responses. When used with Cognitive Behavioural Therapy (CBT), it can act as a distraction, preventing an individual from focusing on their negative thought. Patients can replace a problematic thought with a positive one in order to reduce anxiety and worry. The procedure uses learning principles, such as counterconditioning and punishment. TS can be prescribed to address depression, panic, anxiety and addiction, among other afflictions that involve obsessive thought.

Technique 
The client is asked to list problematic thoughts, worries or obsessions they believe they cannot properly control. Each thought is then translated into a statement in the client’s vocabulary. The Thought Stopping Survey Schedule (TSSS) is also used, where the client rates the frequency of 51 negative statements occurring. The client and a trained therapist will then discuss which thoughts to target and the rationale for eliminating them, as well as understanding that TS can be useful in the future once learnt. The therapist would then instruct the client to think of the target statement and signal when the thought begins, to which the therapist would then shout “Stop!”. This procedure is repeated at different timings, all of which should cause the client to feel startled or shocked. The client will then be told to try and imagine themselves yelling “stop” instead. Through practice, the negative thought should eventually disappear. Clients will receive weekly checks on their technique and to ensure that TS is used appropriately and effectively. Other methods include wearing a rubber band on the wrist and snapping it as punishment when the negative thought occurs. The client would also replace their problematic thought with a more positive or productive thought. The aim is for clients to be able to carry out this technique on their own, using TS to reduce their problematic thoughts even after their therapy sessions have ended.

Evidence 
There has been much empirical evidence of the success of TS in treating various cognitive problems.

Anxiety Problems 
TS has been found to be successful in reducing negative thinking. Participants were low-income, single mothers with children aged between 2 and 6 years, all screened and found to be at risk of depression. They underwent a cognitive-behavioural group intervention where they learnt to use TS to interrupt negative thinking and replace it with a positive thought. At the end of the experiment, participants had shown a decrease in negative thinking, even 6 months after the intervention, thus improving their mental health.

In another study, two clients with preoccupying thoughts were treated with the use of TS by engaging in neutral thoughts and signaling to the therapist as soon as any disturbing thought occurs. Both clients reported an improvement towards controlling their thoughts, allowing them to better engage in their regular activities.

Depression 
Patients with history of depression usually have depressive ruminations which are repetitive but passive thinking about current depression symptoms, their causes, meanings and consequences. TS hence works to reduce such depressive thoughts. In a study on college women at high-risk of depression, participants underwent group interventions for 6 weeks and were assessed for aspects of depression before and after using Beck’s Depression Inventory (BDI). The intervention included thought stopping and positive affirmations, as well as relaxation techniques in order to reduce their negative thinking. Participants were found to have fewer depressive symptoms with lower scores on the BDI, even up to 18 months after the intervention.

Phobias 
In the treatment of Phobias, TS is used to distract patients by reducing occurrence of negative thoughts towards phobic stimulus. Participants with a phobia of spiders underwent either of two conditions: having a stimulus-relevant focused conversation or a stimulus-irrelevant distracting conversation with the experimenter while looking at a live spider in a glass tray. Those in distracting conversations showed reduced fear and performed better on a Behavioural Avoidance Test (BAT) than participants in the other condition.

Additionally, in a case study of two agoraphobic clients, TS was used to try and reduce their anxiety. Clients used an alternative method of TS which aimed to induce anger or other feelings apart from anxiety. This resulted in a successful reduction of obsessional thoughts and the interruption of anxiety producing cognition. It is important to address misconceptions of counterconditioning and ensure verbal reinforcement of progress throughout the procedure.

Misconceptions 
A big misconception of TS is that it is often mistaken as a form of thought suppression. Thought suppression just refers to trying not to think of something and this is not to be confused with TS which involves interrupting one’s own cognitive patterns. Thought suppression has mainly been studied using arbitrary thoughts (such as that of a white bear) making it unrepresentative of real problematic thoughts that involve emotion, which could actually be harder to suppress. Meanwhile, studies on TS has proven it to be effective against problematic cognitions, showing a difference in both phenomena.

With thought suppression mainly being tested with novel thoughts and being used as an avoidance technique, the root source of problematic thoughts are not addressed and individuals are usually left to deal with the aftereffects on their own. It was also found that thought suppression creates greater anxiety and depression in individuals due to thought rebounding where the problematic thought persists more after being suppressed. This counterproductive consequence of thought suppression has made it a questionable technique that is less commonly found in therapy today. Associating TS with thought suppression creates the impression that TS would similarly be ineffective, which is not the case.

References

External links 

 Federal Occupational Health, Thought Stopping: An Antidote for Stress
 Professor William Mikulas, University of West Florida, Behavior Modification, Chapter Nine, Cognitions - see the section on thought stopping
Leahy, Robert L. Psychology Today, Anxiety Files: Why Thought Stopping Doesn't Work. Blog post dated 2010-07-09.

Behavior modification
Cognitive psychology